Avogadro is a molecule editor and visualizer designed for cross-platform use in computational chemistry, molecular modeling, bioinformatics, materials science, and related areas. It is extensible via a plugin architecture.

Features 

 Molecule builder-editor for Windows, Linux, Unix, and macOS.
 All source code is licensed under the GNU General Public License (GPL) version 2.
 Supported languages include: Chinese, English, French, German, Italian, Russian, Spanish, and Polish.
 Supports multi-threaded rendering and computation.
 Plugin architecture for developers, including rendering, interactive tools, commands, and Python scripts.
 OpenBabel import of files, input generation for multiple computational chemistry packages, X-ray crystallography, and biomolecules.

See also

References

External links
 

Free chemistry software
Free software programmed in C++
Molecular modelling software
Computational chemistry software
Science software that uses Qt
Chemistry software for Linux